The 1885 Buffalo Bisons finished the season with a 38–74 record, good for seventh place in the National League.  As things continued to implode on the field, the team ownership sold the whole franchise to the Detroit Wolverines. With all their players gone, the team finished out the season with local amateurs filling in.

Regular season

Season standings

Record vs. opponents

Roster

Player stats

Batting

Starters by position 
Note: Pos = Position; G = Games played; AB = At bats; H = Hits; Avg. = Batting average; HR = Home runs; RBI = Runs batted in

Other batters 
Note: G = Games played; AB = At bats; H = Hits; Avg. = Batting average; HR = Home runs; RBI = Runs batted in

Pitching

Starting pitchers 
Note: G = Games pitched; IP = Innings pitched; W = Wins; L = Losses; ERA = Earned run average; SO = Strikeouts

Relief pitchers 
Note: G = Games pitched; W = Wins; L = Losses; SV = Saves; ERA = Earned run average; SO = Strikeouts

References 
1885 Buffalo Bisons season at Baseball Reference

Buffalo Bisons (NL) seasons
Buffalo Bisons season
Buffalo